Pethia melanomaculata, is a species of cyprinid fish endemic to Sri Lanka.

References

Pethia
Barbs (fish)
Fish described in 1956